Grigol 'Gia' Imedadze (born 2 May 1980) is a Georgian former professional football player.

External links

Footballers from Georgia (country)
Expatriate footballers from Georgia (country)
Süper Lig players
Russian Premier League players
Ukrainian Premier League players
FC Spartak Vladikavkaz players
Kocaelispor footballers
SC Tavriya Simferopol players
Expatriate sportspeople from Georgia (country) in Turkey
Expatriate footballers in Russia
Expatriate footballers in Turkey
Expatriate sportspeople from Georgia (country) in Russia
Expatriate footballers in Ukraine
Expatriate sportspeople from Georgia (country) in Ukraine
1980 births
Living people
Association football forwards